The Ministry of Environment and Energy of the Republic of Croatia is the ministry in the Government of Croatia which is in charge of environmental protection.

Under the Croatian Democratic Union (HDZ) governments the sector of Environmental and Nature Protection was always part of the  Ministry of Construction and Spatial Planning, while in the Social Democratic Party of Croatia (SDP) governments the sector split off and was given a separate ministry.

The government agencies in the jurisdiction of the Ministry have included:
 Environmental Protection Agency
 Agency for Real Estate Brokerage
 State Geodetic Administration
 Croatian Geodetic Institute

List of ministers

Notes
 nb 1.   Served as Minister of Environmental Protection and Physical Planning
nb 2.   Served as Minister of Environmental and Nature Protection from 22 January until 19 October 2016

See also
 Ministry of Construction and Spatial Planning (Croatia)

References

External links
 

Environmental
Croatia
Croatia, Environmental